Henry Woodyer (1816–1896) was an English architect, a pupil of William Butterfield and a disciple of A. W. N. Pugin and the Ecclesiologists.

Life
Woodyer was born in Guildford, Surrey, England, in 1816, the son of a successful, highly respected surgeon, who owned Allen House in the Upper High Street. His mother came from the wealthy Halsey family who owned Henley Park, just outside Guildford.

Woodyer was educated first at Eton College, then at Merton College, Oxford. As a result, he could claim to be one of the best educated architects since Sir Christopher Wren. Whilst at Oxford, he became involved in the Anglican high church movement and throughout his career he saw his work as an architect as a means of serving the church.

Works

Churches (new)

 Holy Innocents' Church, Highnam, Gloucestershire (including sexton's cottage), 1847
 St Michael's Church, Camberley, Surrey, 1849-51
 St Paul's Church, Sketty, Swansea, Glamorgan, 1849–50, for John Henry Vivian
 Holy Jesus' Church, Lydbrook, Gloucestershire, 1850–51
 Christ Church, Christchurch Road, Reading, Berkshire, 1861-2
 St Peter's Church, Hascombe 1862, described by Betjeman as "a Tractarian work of art"
 St Paul's Church, Langleybury, Abbots Langley (1863-5)
 St Augustine's Church, Haggerston, 1866-7, Woodyer's only London church, closed in 1983 and converted to arts centre in 1997
 St Martin's Church, Dorking (1868–77) described by Sir Nikolaus Pevsner as Woodyer's most important
 All Saints Church, Portfield, Chichester (1869–71)
 St Andrew's Church, Grafham, Surrey
 St James Church, Farnham, Surrey (1876)
 St John the Baptist Church, Odo Street, Hafod, Swansea, 1878–80, for Henry Hussey Vivian
 St John the Evangelist Church, Woodley, Berkshire, 1873, for Robert Palmer
 Holy Trinity Church, Millbrook, Southampton (1873–1880)
 Church of St Luke, Burpham Surrey, 1859
Church of St Peter and Holy Cross, Wherwell, Hampshire
 Chapel at Convent of St John the Baptist, Clewer, Berkshire (1881)

Churches (restoration or rebuilding)
 St Blaise Church, Milton, Berkshire (now Oxfordshire), 1849–51
 St Nicolas' Church, Newbury, Berkshire, 1858
 St Mary's Church, Caldicot, Monmouthshire, 1859
 St Andrew's parish church, Clewer, Berkshire: north arcade, 1858
 St John the Evangelist, Twinstead, Essex, 1859-60
 St John the Baptist parish church, Berwick St John, Wiltshire, 1861
 St Bartholomew's parish church, Wanborough, Surrey, 1861
 St George's parish church, Evenley, Northamptonshire 1864-5
 St Lawrence parish church, Toot Baldon, Oxfordshire, 1865
 St Swithin's parish church, Compton Bassett, Wiltshire: chancel, chancel chapels and north porch (1866)
 St Laurence parish church, Caversfield, Oxfordshire, 1874
 All Saints parish church, Wokingham, Berkshire.
 St John the Divine parish church, Patching, West Sussex, 1888–89

Other institutional buildings

 School (now the Stewart Hall), Sketty, Swansea, 1853, for John Henry Vivian
 St Edmund's Church School, Salisbury, Wiltshire, 1860
 Fisherton Anger Church School, Fisherton, Salisbury, Wiltshire, 1867
 House of Mercy, Clewer, Berkshire, 1853–73
 Cranleigh School, Surrey 1863-65 and the Chapel 1869
 New Schools, Eton College, 1861–63
The "Burning Bush", Eton (1864)
 St Michael's College, Tenbury Wells, Worcestershire
 The Chapel at St Thomas's Home for the Friendless and Fallen, Darlington Road, Basingstoke dedicated on 21 July 1885, the eve of St Mary Magdalen's feast day
 All Saints Hospital and Chapel, Eastbourne (1867–74)
 House of Mercy,

Domestic buildings

 Woodyer House, Bramley, Surrey
 Muntham Court in Findon, West Sussex rebuilt in Jacobean style between 1877 and 1887
 Alterations to Parc Wern (now Parc Beck), Sketty, Glamorgan, 1851–3 for H.H. Vivian
 Church Cottage, Tutshill, Gloucestershire, c. 1852.
 Brynmill Lodge (gate-lodge) and (attributed) Verandah (a small Gothic house, 1853) at Singleton Abbey, Swansea) for J.H. Vivian
 Alterations to Hall Place, Buckinghamshire, 1868
 Alterations to Tyntesfield, Wraxall, Somerset for Matilda Blanche Gibbs, circa 1880
 Twyford Moors House Twyford, Hants  1861
 Creeting House, Suffolk 1863
 St Paul’s Mews, Reading - Built as a site office for the construction of Christ Church and gifted to the local parish on completion. Was subsequently used as a church hall for St Paul’s church, Whitley Wood, a school and the headquarters for Thames Valley Police motorway division before being converted in to six residential dwellings in the early eighties.

References

Sources

1816 births
1896 deaths
People educated at Eton College
Alumni of Merton College, Oxford
19th-century English architects
Gothic Revival architects
English ecclesiastical architects
Architects from Surrey